Gaius Julius Alexander was a Herodian Prince who lived in the 1st century and 2nd century in the Roman Empire.

Alexander was of Jewish, Nabataean, Edomite, Greek, Armenian and Persian ancestry. He was the son of the Herodian Prince, later king Tigranes VI of Armenia and his wife Opgalli. In the spring of 58, his father was crowned as king of Armenia by Roman Emperor Nero in Rome and ruled until 63. Alexander had a sister called Julia, who married the Anatolian Roman Senator Marcus Plancius Varus.

Alexander's paternal grandparents were the Judean Prince Alexander and his unnamed wife. Through his father, Alexander was the great-grandson of Cappadocian Princess Glaphyra and Judean Prince Alexander. He was the great-great-grandson of king Archelaus of Cappadocia, king of Judea Herod the Great and his wife Mariamne. Alexander along with his sister and father were the last of the known descendants of the kings of Cappadocia. Prior to the year 58, little is known on Alexander's life. It is unlikely that he attempted to exert influence on Judean politics.

Tigranes had arranged with king Antiochus IV of Commagene, with whom he was an ally, for the marriage of Alexander to Antiochus' daughter Julia Iotapa. The betrothal was held in Rome after Tigranes' coronation. After the betrothal, Nero crowned Alexander and Iotapa as Roman client rulers of the small Cilician region of Cetis, which had previously been ruled by Alexander's Seleucid ancestors, then by Archelaus of Cappadocia, and then by Archelaus of Cilicia and Antiochus IV. The Cilician city of Elaiussa Sebaste was made a part of their kingdom. Alexander and Iotapa ruled Cetis from 58 until at least 72.

Little is known about the marriage and reign of Alexander and Iotapa. Iotapa bore Alexander three children: two sons Gaius Julius Agrippa, Gaius Julius Alexander Berenicianus and a daughter Julia Iotapa. Their children were born and raised in Cetis. A possible descendant from their marriage was the usurper Jotapianus, who lived in the 3rd century. His name and the names Alexander gave his sons indicate that their family connections with the Herodian Dynasty were not wholly broken. Later in his life, Alexander had entered the Roman Senate and served as a suffect consul in 116.

Sources

 http://www.roman-emperors.org/philarab.htm
 https://web.archive.org/web/20080503055949/http://www.ancientlibrary.com/smith-bio/1532.html
 https://web.archive.org/web/20110605233914/http://www.ancientlibrary.com/smith-bio/1722.html
 
 acsearch.info ancient coin search engine: Kings of Armenia
 Anthony Wagner, Pedigree and Progress, Essays in the Genealogical Interpretation of History, London, Philmore, 1975. Rutgers Alex CS4.W33 

Herodian dynasty
Alexander, Gaius
People from Roman Anatolia
Roman client rulers
Suffect consuls of Imperial Rome
1st-century Romans
2nd-century Romans